Endeavor Business Media is an American business-to-business media company founded by Chris Ferrell and others in December 2017. The company is headquartered in Nashville, Tennessee.

History 
Endeavor Business Media acquires and operates trade publications, websites, marketing solutions and events. In 2018 Endeavor acquired the publication assets of SouthComm and seven other companies. The company acquired several publications and events from British company Clarion Events, who had previously acquired these assets from PennWell Corporation, and from Informa Intelligence, a division of Informa, in 2019.

References

Publishing companies of the United States